Masset Airport  is located  northeast of Masset, British Columbia, Canada. In 2008 the airport began services using a 737 jet.

History 
The airport was constructed in July 1943 as RCAF Station Masset. It was built by the RCAF's No. 9 Construction Maintenance Unit. The original landing strip was a perforated steel plate runway, which was built in a record breaking 14 days. At the end of World War II RCAF Station Masset was surplus to requirements, so in 1945 it was mothballed.

CFS Masset a radio relay station, was built adjacent to RCAF Station Masset in 1942.

Airlines and destinations

Incidents and accidents 

 On 11 January 1995 a Canada Jet Charters Learjet 35 (registration C-GPUN) crashed into the water whilst performing an approach into Runway 12. Investigators concluded that the flight likely had its altimeter calibrated to the wrong pressure setting, causing it to descend too low whilst still far from the runway. The aircraft was performing an Air-Ambulance flight from Vancouver to Masset. All five occupants on board the aircraft were killed.

See also
Masset Water Aerodrome

References

External links

Airports in Haida Gwaii
Registered aerodromes in British Columbia
North Coast Regional District
Graham Island